Ajla (spoken "eye-lə") is a feminine given name in various areas around the Eastern Mediterranean. In Arabic it means the “brightest”, “most dazzling”, “most brilliant”, smart. In Turkish it means ’’moonlight’’’ or “halo”, and in Bosnia and Herzegovina the name means "The one who shines in moonlight". The given name is also used elsewhere in the former Yugoslavia such as Croatia.

Ajla also means “oak tree” in Hebrew.

Etymology
From Turkish word Ayla, halo around the moon.

People 

 Ajla Del Ponte, Swiss sprinter
 Ajla Hodžić, Bosnian actress
 Ajla Tomljanović, Croatian-Australian professional tennis player

References

Feminine given names